Hail the Apocalypse is the fifth album by Swedish metal band Avatar, released on 13 May 2014. It is their first album to chart on the US Billboard 200, reaching number 97 and selling 3,500 copies in its first week. The album was mixed by Jay Ruston and mastered by Paul Logus.

Track listing

Personnel

Avatar 
Johannes Eckerström – lead vocals
Jonas "Kungen" Jarlsby – guitar
Tim Öhrström – guitar, backing vocals
Henrik Sandelin – bass, backing vocals
John Alfredsson – drums

Charts

References 

2014 albums
Avatar (Swedish band) albums
Albums produced by Tobias Lindell